Holler may refer to:

Places
 Holler, Germany, a municipality in Rhineland-Palatinate
 Holler, Luxembourg, a village in Weiswampach

People
 Höller, a German surname
 Holler (surname)

Arts, entertainment, and media
 Holler (film), a 2020 American drama film
 Holler (EP), a 2014 EP by Girls' Generation-TTS, or its title track
 "Holler" (Ginuwine song), 1997
 "Holler" (Spice Girls song), 2000
 Field holler, a song form
 Goofy holler, a stock sound effect that is used frequently in Disney cartoons and films

See also
 Holder (surname)
 Holla (disambiguation)
 Hollar (disambiguation)